Coconut Rough were a short-lived New Zealand pop/new wave band formed in 1982.

Despite their 1983 first single, "Sierra Leone", hitting the top five, and the band being named Most Promising Group of the Year at that year's RIANZ Awards they split up in 1984.

History
The band was formed in 1982 by lead singer Andrew Snoid, formerly with New Zealand bands the Whizz Kids, Pop Mechanix and Australian-based New Zealand group the Swingers, and guitarist Mark Bell. Bell later joined Snoid in a reformed Pop Mechanix. Other member were bassist Dennis "Choc" Te Whare, keyboardist Stuart Pearce and drummer Paul Hewitt, and later bassist Bones Hillman. They decided on the name "Coconut Rough" based on a type of sweet treat popular in Australia and New Zealand.

The band's biggest hit was also their first single. "Sierra Leone" reached number five in the 1983 New Zealand pop charts. The song was aided by one of the first New Zealand music videos with special effects. In 2001, Sierra Leone was voted the 94th best New Zealand song of all time by members of APRA.

They were an opening act for the Police at their Western Springs concert in 1984, but had folded before the end of that year.

Discography

Awards

References

External links
 [ The AMG profile for Coconut Rough]
 Coconut Rough at thebigcity.co.nz
 Sierra Leone music video, courtesy NZ On Screen

APRA Award winners
New Zealand new wave musical groups
Musical groups established in 1982
1982 establishments in New Zealand
1984 disestablishments in New Zealand
Musical groups disestablished in 1984